Cromen was a town in the west of ancient Pontus, inhabited in Roman and Byzantine times. According to the Tabula Peutingeriana it was 11 M.P. from Amasia.

Its site is located near Çatalkaya, Asiatic Turkey.

References

Populated places in ancient Pontus
Former populated places in Turkey
Roman towns and cities in Turkey
Populated places of the Byzantine Empire
History of Amasya Province